Günther Lohre (12 May 1953 – 15 March 2019) was a German athlete. He competed in the men's pole vault at the 1976 Summer Olympics.

References

External links
 

1953 births
2019 deaths
Athletes (track and field) at the 1976 Summer Olympics
German male pole vaulters
Olympic athletes of West Germany
People from Leonberg
Sportspeople from Stuttgart (region)